Prelože is a village in the hills northwest of Ilirska Bistrica in the Inner Carniola region of Slovenia.

The local church in the settlement is dedicated to Saint Giles and belongs to the Parish of Pregarje.

References

External links
Prelože on Geopedia

Populated places in the Municipality of Ilirska Bistrica